Your Mother Should Know: Brad Mehldau Plays The Beatles is a solo piano album by Brad Mehldau. It was recorded in September 2020 and released by Nonesuch Records on 10 February 2023.

Music and recording
The album was recorded live on the stage of the Philharmonie de Paris in September 2020 where Mehldau played a program of Beatles songs that were previously unperformed by him. Also Mehldau recorded the David Bowie's 1971 track "Life on Mars?."

Release and reception

Matt Collar of AllMusic commented, "...Mehldau treating each Beatles tune as he might a jazz standard, reconsidering the harmony of the song and using the melody as jumping-off point for his own bold, endlessly lyrical improvisations. What's particularly enjoyable about Mehldau's approach is how he keeps each song recognizable while making it his own..." Selwyn Harris of Jazzwise stated, "Recorded live at the Philharmonie de Paris, it focusses mostly on a selection of the Fab Four's lesser-known album tracks, none of which have been recorded by him previously. Throughout, Mehldau is at his most succinctly refined, as if he has chipped away at anything non-essential or that sounds like it's falling into the trap of merely jazzing up The Beatles, as those before him have too frequently done."

Martin Johnson of The Wall Street Journal wrote that "The new album aims for smaller changes rather than full-blown reinvention." Steven Wine writing for Associated Press added, "The album pairs jazz’s most lyrical living pianist with songwriting masters of melody, and Mehldau finds fresh radiance in the familiar tunes by exploring their elasticity, which is considerable. These performances show how Beatles songs invite improvisation thanks to their lilt, sturdy construction and sophisticated chord changes. Plus, as Mehldau observes in his liner notes, they swing."

Track listing

Personnel
Brad Mehldau – piano

Chart performance

References

Brad Mehldau albums
Nonesuch Records albums
2023 albums